Sepata Dukata Sunny is a 2003 Sri Lankan Sinhala comedy, family film directed by Roy de Silva. It stars Bandu Samarasinghe in lead role along with Sangeetha Weeraratne, Cletus Mendis and Sriyani Amarasena. Music for the film is done by Somapala Rathnayake. It is the 1006th Sri Lankan film in the Sinhala cinema.

Plot

Cast
 Bandu Samarasinghe as Ambewela Mudiyanselage Don Sunny
 James Lewis as young Bond at the station
 Sangeetha Weeraratne as Sempamutti Arachchige Tara Kumarihami
 Cletus Mendis as Tara's brother
 Sriyani Amarasena as Silawathi, Sunny's mother
 Ruwanthi Mangala as Mala
 Nilanthi Dias as Geetha
 Nirosha Herath as Seetha
 Rajitha Hiran as Tarzan
 Mangala Premaratne as Sattan
 Ananda Wickramage as Station master
 Teddy Vidyalankara as Henchman
 Jayantha Bopearachchi as Post Office master
 Ronnie Leitch as Charlie, Geetha's brother
 Susil Perera as Seetha's brother
 Mabel Blythe as Mala's mother
 Upali Keerthisena as Lawyer

References

External links
Excerpt on youtube.com

2003 films
2000s Sinhala-language films